Interstate 73 (I-73) is a north–south Interstate Highway, located within the US state of North Carolina. Currently, there is one continuous section of I-73, totaling , first traversing the U.S. Route 220 (US 220) freeway  from Ellerbe, North Carolina, to I-85 in Greensboro, North Carolina, then along the southwestern segment of the Greensboro Outer Loop  from US 220 to Bryan Boulevard, then  along a freeway from Bryan Boulevard west then north to US 220 near Summerfield, North Carolina.

I-73 is planned to be a much longer corridor, defined by various federal laws to run from Myrtle Beach, South Carolina, to Sault Ste. Marie, Michigan. Once active projects are completed, it will only run from Myrtle Beach, South Carolina to Roanoke, Virginia, where it will end at I-81. Ohio does not plan to build any part of the highway because the I-73 corridor in that state is already served by existing freeways or four-lane highways that will eventually be upgraded to freeways. Michigan is not planning to build the interstate as they abandoned the I-73 project after June 12, 2001, diverting the funds to safety improvement projects along the corridor instead. West Virginia is building its section, mostly along US 52, as a four-lane divided highway, but not meeting the Interstate Highway standards. On the other hand, North Carolina and South Carolina have built sections and Virginia plans to build its part.

Associated with these plans are those for the extension of I-74 from Cincinnati to Myrtle Beach, with several highway overlaps contemplated.

Route description

|-
|SC || ||
|-
|NC ||
|-
|VA || ||
|-
|WV || ||
|-
|OH || ||
|-
|MI || ||
|-
|Total ||
|}

South Carolina

North Carolina

North Carolina is the only state that has a finished section of I-73, . It traverses along the US 220 freeway from Ellerbe, through Asheboro, to Greensboro; all within the central Piedmont. When completed, it will also connect the cities of Rockingham and Madison.

Virginia

I-73 currently does not exist in Virginia, but there are plans to build it. Signs that say "Future I-73 Corridor" can be found along I-581.

History
In 1979, K.A. Ammar, a businessperson from Bluefield, West Virginia, started the Bluefield-to-Huntington Highway Association in order to widen US 52, a very dangerous two-lane road used to transport coal from mines to barges on the Ohio River. With coal employment in decline and the desire to bring in other businesses, Ammar worked to get the road improved. In 1989, Bluefield State College Professor John Sage learned of plans to add more Interstate Highways. Ammar and Sage came up with the idea for a road that would be called I-73, to run from Detroit, Michigan, to Charleston, South Carolina. Ammar and others promoted the idea to the people of Portsmouth, Ohio, and Myrtle Beach, South Carolina.

In 1991, as Congress worked on reauthorization of the Surface Transportation Act, the people from West Virginia worked to get I-73 approved; the highway would run alongside US 52. The influential Robert Byrd, at the time West Virginia's senior senator, chaired the Senate Appropriations Committee, but even Byrd said funding for such a highway would be hard to find. In North Carolina, Marc Bush of the Greensboro Area Chamber of Commerce admitted the plan would benefit his area but said it was not a priority.

The Intermodal Surface Transportation Efficiency Act of 1991 (ISTEA) defined High Priority Corridor 5, the "I-73/74 North–South Corridor" from Charleston, South Carolina, through Winston-Salem, North Carolina, to Portsmouth, Ohio, to Cincinnati, Ohio, and Detroit, Michigan. This would provide for a single corridor from Charleston, splitting at Portsmouth, with I-74 turning west to its current east end in Cincinnati, and I-73 continuing north to Detroit.

In North Carolina, any new construction would require more money than the state had available, but Walter C. Sprouse Jr., executive director of the Randolph County Economic Development Corporation, pointed out that most of the route of I-73 included roads already scheduled for improvements that would make them good enough for interstate designation. A connector between I-77 and US 52 at Mount Airy was planned, and US 52 from Mount Airy to Winston-Salem and US 311 from Winston-Salem to High Point were four-lane divided highways. A US 311 bypass of High Point was planned, which would eventually connect to US 220 at Randleman. I-73 would follow US 220 to Rockingham. Another possibility was following I-40 from Winston-Salem to Greensboro. Congestion on US 52 in Winston-Salem was anticipated to be an issue. The route through High Point was approved in May 1993.

However, by November of that year, an organization called Job Link, made up of business leaders from northern North Carolina and southern Virginia, wanted a major highway to connect Roanoke with the Greensboro area. It could be I-73, the group said, but did not have to be. In April 1995, John Warner, who chaired the Senate subcommittee that would select the route of I-73, announced his support for the Job Link proposal. This distressed Winston-Salem officials who were counting on I-73, though Greensboro had never publicly sought the road. But an aide to US Senator Lauch Faircloth said the 1991 law authorizing I-73 required the road to go through Winston-Salem. Faircloth got around this requirement, though, by asking Warner to call the highway to Winston-Salem I-74. In May, Warner announced plans to propose legislation that made the plan for two Interstates official.

The National Highway System Designation Act of 1995 added a branch from Toledo, Ohio, to Sault Ste. Marie, Michigan, via the US 223 and US 127 corridors. (At the time, US 127 north of Lansing was part of US 27.) It also gave details for the alignments in West Virginia, Virginia, North Carolina, and South Carolina. I-73 and I-74 were to split near Bluefield, joining again between Randleman and Rockingham; both would end at Charleston. The American Association of State Highway and Transportation Officials (AASHTO) approved the sections of I-73 and I-74 south of I-81 in Virginia (with I-74 to end at I-73 near Myrtle Beach) on July 25, 1996, allowing for them to be marked once built to Interstate standards and connected to other Interstate Highways. The final major change came with the Transportation Equity Act for the 21st Century of 1998 (TEA-21), when both routes were truncated to Georgetown, South Carolina.

North Carolina took the lead in signing highways as I-73 following AASHTO's approval and since has finished and approved construction projects to build new sections of the Interstate Highway. The only other progress in building I-73 can be seen in Virginia and South Carolina. In 2005, Virginia completed an environmental impact statement (EIS) for its recommended route for I-73 from I-81 in Roanoke to the North Carolina border. The Federal Highway Administration (FHWA) approved the EIS report in April 2007. Virginia can now go ahead to draw up plans to construct the highway and proceed to build it once funds are obtained. South Carolina also has shown recent interest in building its section of I-73 with a corridor selected for the route from I-95 to Myrtle Beach in 2006 and a final decision on how the highway should be routed north of I-95 to the North Carolina border in July 2007. In January 2006, the South Carolina state legislature introduced bills to construct I-73 as a toll highway. It is hoped a guaranteed stream of revenue will allow it to build its section of I-73 within 10 years. The FHWA approved South Carolina's proposal on August 10, 2007.

On January 9, 2019, it was announced that the North Carolina Department of Transportation's (NCDOT) State Transportation Improvement Program for 2020 to 2029 included connecting I-73 with US 74 six years sooner than planned.

Ohio and Michigan both abandoned further environmental studies on their portions of I-73. It is important to note that most of the I-73 corridor in both of these states follows existing freeways or highways scheduled to be upgraded to freeways under plans that predate I-73.

Future

South Carolina

I-73 and I-74 both will begin at Myrtle Beach. I-73 splits to the northwest to Rockingham, North Carolina.

Future I-73 will traverse northeastern South Carolina, from the Grand Strand to Bennettsville. The current alignment will replace South Carolina Highway 22 (SC 22) and run parallel north of US 501 and SC 38. In June 2017, the US Army Corps of Engineers approved permits required to build I-73. Now funding needs to be acquired, which may make I-73 a toll road in South Carolina.

On May 30, 2006, the South Carolina Department of Transportation (SCDOT) announced its preferred routing of I-73 between Myrtle Beach and I-95. I-73 will begin where SC 22 starts at US 17 near Briarcliffe Acres. It will then proceed northwesterly, crossing the proposed routing of I-74 (currently SC 31, the Carolina Bays Parkway). I-73 will then use an upgraded SC 917 to cross the Little Pee Dee River. It will then proceed on a new freeway alignment between SC 917 and I-95 that would have an interchange with US 76 west of Mullins and then would proceed northwesterly to an exit with US 501 near Latta, passing that city to the south before intersecting I-95 near SC 38. After crossing I-95, I-73 will use the chosen middle route, one of six potential alternative corridors that were studied all of which roughly paralleling SC 38 to proceed further north to the North Carolina state line. These alternative corridors were formally announced to the public on September 7, 2006, at a meeting in Bennettsville. The number of possible routes was reduced to three, and a final decision on the preferred northern route was announced on July 19, 2007. The central route caused the least disruption to homes, farms, and wetlands. NCDOT and SCDOT previously agreed to an I-73 corridor crossing the state line along SC 38 and NC 38 near Hamlet, North Carolina, on February 11, 2005. Previously, I-73 had been planned to cross the state line further west, near US 1 south of Rockingham, North Carolina.

In February 2008, the record of decision (ROD) for the final EIS for the section of I-73 from I-95 to SC 22 was signed. An October 22, 2008, ceremony marked the signing of the ROD for the section from near Hamlet to I-95.

On November 7, 2011, Myrtle Beach city council member Wayne Gray asked area elected officials to consider using Road Improvement and Development Effort (RIDE) funds to pay for a portion of I-73.

In June 2012, Miley and Associates of Columbia recommended improvements to SC 38 and US 501 to create the Grand Strand Expressway (GSX), a position long held by the Coastal Conservation League, which asked for the study. South Carolina Representative Alan D. Clemmons, head of the National I-73 Corridor Association, said such a plan had been considered but was not likely. Nancy Cave of the Coastal Conservation League reiterated support for upgrading SC 38 and US 501, along with US 521 and SC 9, after results of a new study were presented at an August 1, 2012, meeting of the Myrtle Beach Area Chamber of Commerce. The study claimed that 90,000 people could leave the area 10 hours faster in an evacuation with I-73 and Southern Evacuation Lifeline (SELL) both in place.

The "I-73 Intermediate Traffic and Revenue Study" by C&M Associates, dated February 2016, was to be presented to state transportation officials March 24, 2016. It included upgrades to SC 22. RIDE III, if approved by voters, would also provide funding for the Southern Evacuation Lifeline.

Virginia

Future I-73 is planned to connect Martinsville and Roanoke, then head west to Blacksburg before entering West Virginia.

In Virginia, I-73 will continue north from the state line parallel to the US 220 corridor all the way to Roanoke. US 220 is currently a rural four-lane highway with many safety issues. As such, Virginia has decided to have I-73 immediately diverge from US 220 upon entering the state from North Carolina and travel around the east side of Martinsville, with US 220 as a freeway around the west side of Martinsville. The two will meet briefly south of Rocky Mount. I-73 will continue its northbound journey paralleling US 220 to the east until they converge south of Roanoke. At that point, I-73 and US 220 will run concurrently to I-581, which I-73 will follow to I-81.

If I-73 is extended northward, from Roanoke, it will turn southwest on I-81, running concurrently to east of Blacksburg and then using the Virginia Smart Road to Blacksburg. The rest of the way to West Virginia will be an upgrade of US 460, Corridor Q of the Appalachian Development Highway System.

West Virginia

Future I-73 is planned to enter, from Virginia, near Bluefield and then go northwesterly along the King Coal Highway to Huntington.

I-73 will continue next to US 460 (Corridor Q) from the Virginia state line west to Bluefield. There it will join with I-74, which splits from I-77 just across the border from Virginia. For the rest of its path through West Virginia, from Bluefield to Huntington and Ohio, I-73 will follow US 52, which is currently being upgraded to a four-lane divided highway as the King Coal Highway to Williamson and the Tolsia Highway the rest of the way to Huntington. This section has been sporadically marked as the Future I-73/I-74 Corridor with signs but is not being built to Interstate standards.

Ohio

Future I-73 is planned to parallel US 52 to Portsmouth, then north with US 23 through Columbus and Toledo.

In Ohio, I-73 was planned to parallel US 52 to Portsmouth. A four-lane controlled highway known as the Portsmouth Bypass was under construction. When completed in 2019, this bypass runs from US 52 to US 23, along State Route 823 (SR 823) just north of Lucasville. I-73 and I-74 would continue north to SR 32, where I-74 would split from I-73, and I-73 would head north along US 23 the rest of the way through Columbus to Toledo and the Michigan state line. The part from Portsmouth to Columbus is Corridor C of the Appalachian Development Highway System. In Columbus, I-73 would most likely follow SR 315 through Columbus. In Toledo, I-73 would likely follow I-280's alignment and likely route along I-475 before branching off with US 23 into Michigan. However, routes in the Columbus and Toledo areas have not yet been officially determined. Ohio has abandoned further study of the I-73 corridor, since the Ohio Department of Transportation (ODOT) plans to eventually upgrade the US 23/US 52 corridor from Toledo to Portsmouth to a freeway. Nonetheless, the option to designate the corridor as I-73 once all upgrades are complete remains open, contingent upon what happens with the connecting route in West Virginia.

On February 5, 2009, the Governor Ted Strickland proposed allowing tolls to be collected on newly built sections of highway. One of the proposed routes includes the Columbus–Toledo corridor, which is currently served by US 23 as an expressway largely without limited access.

A new project has been initiated by ODOT to complete a study of the US 23 corridor between the village of Waldo and I-270. The goal of this project is to create a free-flow connection between Columbus and Toledo. Some of the alternatives to be explored include upgrading the existing alignment or creating new corridors to US 33 to the west or I-71 to the east of the current corridor. There are no plans to sign this as an Interstate Highway at this time.

Michigan

Future I-73 was planned to go northwesterly to Jackson then go north with US 127 to Grayling. From there, the corridor would have continued along I-75 to Sault Ste. Marie.

The original defined alignment of I-73 would have run along I-75 to Detroit. However, Congress amended that definition in 1995 to have a branch along the US 223 corridor to south of Jackson and the US 127 corridor north to I-75 near Grayling. From Grayling, it would have used I-75 to Sault Ste. Marie. Except south of Jackson, where the existing highways are two-lane roads and a section of road north of Lansing where the freeway reverts to a divided highway, this corridor is mostly a rural four-lane freeway. The Michigan Department of Transportation (MDOT) included using the US 223 corridor as one of its three options to build I-73 in 2000. The others included using the US 127 corridor all the way into Ohio with a connection to the Ohio Turnpike or using US 127 south and a new freeway connection to US 223 at Adrian. MDOT abandoned further study of I-73 after June 12, 2001, diverting remaining funding to safety improvement projects along the corridor. The department stated there was a "lack of need" for sections of the proposed freeway, and the project website was closed down in 2002. According to press reports in 2011, a group advocating on behalf of the freeway was working to revive the I-73 project in Michigan. According to an MDOT spokesperson, "to my knowledge, we're not taking that issue up again". The Lenawee County Road Commission is not interested in the freeway, and, according to the president of the Adrian Area Chamber of Commerce, "there seems to be little chance of having an I-73 link between Toledo and Jackson built in the foreseeable future."

See also

References

External links

High Priority Corridors @ AARoads.com: Interstate 73/74 (Corridor 5) 
Interstate 73 Environmental Impact Study (South Carolina)
The South Carolina I-73 Story
I-73/74 in North Carolina
NCRoads.com: I-73
The Ohio Interstate 73 Page
National I-73/74/75 Corridor Association

 
Interstate Highway System
Interstate Highways in West Virginia
Interstate Highways in Ohio
Interstate Highways in Michigan